Paphos Archaeological Museum is a museum in Paphos, western Cyprus. It contains items ranging in age from the Neolithic to 1700 AD, with five rooms showcasing exhibits dating from the Neolithic era to the Middle Ages. Most of the artefacts were unearthed in Palepafos (Kouklia), Nea Pafos (Paphos) and Marion-Arsinoe (Polis), and also from Pegeia, Kisonerga, Lempa, Pano Arodes, Salamiou, Akourdalia, Pomos, Kidasi, Geroskipou and other places. The collection includes skeletal remains recovered from 31 tombs near the eastern seafront of the ancient city of Nea Pafos in 1980–3.

External links

References

Archaeological museums in Cyprus
Paphos